The Allegheny pearl dace ('Margariscus margarita) is a species of cyprinid fish. It is demersal, freshwater fish, with a dark green back and silvery body. This species is omnivorous, consuming algae, as well as arthropods. M. margarita's range spans southern Canada and the northern United States. While not considered endangered at the federal level in the United States, several states either consider this species endangered or threatened; it faces threats of habitat destruction and invasive species.

The maximum age M. margarita has been recorded to reach is four years. The body is long with small eyes and mouth. There are eight rays each in the dorsal fin, anal fin, and pelvic fins. The dorsal side is dark green in colour, with silvery flanks and a grey or white ventral side. Between late autumn and summer, males may have a brilliant orange-red stripe on the flanks, below the lateral line.

This species is omnivorous: its diet comprises algae, as well as arthropods, such as chironomids and water fleas. M. margarita spawns in the spring. This species typically reaches sexual maturity at one year.

Distribution and habitat
This species inhabits North America, in southern Canada and the northern United States. It can be found in the Mississippi River, Hudson Bay, and the Great Lakes. M. margarita inhabits lakes, ponds, and rivers, usually over a sandy or gravelly substrate. It feeds by sight, so waters it inhabits are generally clear streams and bog drainage systems.

Relationship to humansMargariscus margarita is not considered endangered federally in the United States; however, in several states, it is considered endangered or threatened. The species is uncommon in the Great Plains region, having declined since the region's settlement. M. margarita is threatened mainly by habitat destruction and alteration, and introduced species. Human activities such as reservoir construction, groundwater pumping, stream diversions, and channelization all contribute to the former. The introduction of exotic species such as bass, pike, or trout have an especially detrimental effect on this species. M. margarita'' is also caught for use as bait, which may contribute to its decline.

References

Margariscus
Cyprinid fish of North America
Fish described in 1867